La Bastide-de-Sérou is a commune in the Ariège department in the Occitanie region of south-western France.

The inhabitants of the commune are known as Bastidiens or Bastidiennes.

Geography
La Bastide-de-Sérou is a commune in the Pre-Pyrenees some 15 km south-west of Pamiers and 15 km west by north-west of Foix. It has the odd characteristic of another small commune, Suzan, fully enclosed in the commune. Access to the commune is by the D117 road from Montels in the east which passes through the south of the commune and the village continuing west to Castelnau-Durban. The D49 branches off the D117 in the commune and goes north-west to Allières. The D211 also branches off the D117 in the commune and goes north-east in a circular route back to the D117 via Cadarcet. The D501 goes north from the village to Suzan then continues north to join the D1A east of Gabre. The D42 branches off the D117 in the commune and goes south to Larbont. The D15 goes south-east from the village to Nescus. Apart from the village there are the hamlets of Aron and Brouzenac. The commune is mainly farmland but has forested foothills of the Pyrenees in the north.

The Arize river flows through the south of the commune and the village from east to west to eventually join the Garonne at Carbonne. The Lèze, tributary of the Ariège, has its source in the north-eastern part of the commune and flows north-westwards forming part of the commune's northern border with the lac de Mondely (Mondely lake). Several tributaries rise in the commune and flow into the Lèze including the: Goute des Labadous, Goute du Saou, and Le Gouteret on the left bank and the: Goute du Ribe and Goute des Mouliniers on the right bank. The Ruisseau de Pézegues, Ruisseau de Chichorie, and the Ruisseau de Fourmintas all flow from the south, the first two joining into the Ruisseau de Vic and all join the Arize on the left bank.

History

The Pays des Serones was originally populated with Gallic tribes.

In the Middle Ages, La Bastide-de-Sérou was the capital of one of the sixteen castellanies of the County of Foix. Remains are still visible (Some Amphora at Nescus, the dry lake of Alzen, the Atiels mine, a Gallo-Roman path towards Castelnau-Durban).

In 1150 La Bastide-de-Serou was called Montesquieu (Mount Farouche) and was then composed of the districts of Noir and Faurie.

In 1246 Montesquieu became La Bastide d'Antuzan.

In 1252 the commune came under the charter of Roger IV, Count of Foix, that challenged the monopoly of the mills and forges. Instead the place returned to its old name and Roger IV surrounded it with a circle of walls with four doors: the Porte du Mas, Porte de Foix, Porte d'Arize, and Porte de la Faurie.

It was in the 14th century that the town took its current name. The castle, mentioned in 1255, was razed on the order of Louis XIII. It housed a garrison of the Count of Foix and a prison. Its imposing walls were encircled by a walkway. The city was still walled in 1672.

Gaston I, Count of Foix, who had married Ferdinande of Negroponte, was called to the court of Philip the Fair. This encouraged a love affair between Gaston I and his niece, Jeanne d'Artois, at the expense of Ferdinande Negroponte. Gaston I sent an envoy to the pope to request a repudiation authorization against Ferdinande. This was refused. Philip the Fair overruled the refusal and forced his chaplain to sanctify the new marriage. Ferdinande took refuge in the castle of La Bastide-de-Serou. Their relationship lasted nevertheless and Ferdinande became pregnant. She settled in "the tower" at La Bastide-de-Serou where she gave birth to a boy, Lou. ("The Tour de Lou" has now become "La tour du Loup" meaning "The Wolf Tower"). Gaston I built the Abbey of Salenques at Les Bordes-sur-Arize for Ferdinande.

The title of mayor appeared for the first time in 1745. Like many towns in the region, women and men were equal in making decisions.

The events of 1789 became known later and led to the confiscation of arms of the nobility, priests hiding in fear, and the closure of the church where six of the bells were melted down.

The tree of Liberty was erected at the top of the square and was replanted in 1848. It gave birth to a song: Aquet arbré, aro l'aben arrapat …

In 1823, the Parade ground was planted with Elm trees (which were replaced by plane trees in 1836). Also in 1823, the municipality bought a building in the Church Square for a hospice.

The current covered market dates to 1829-1830 and replaced an old one whose roof had rested on 21 stone pillars. The grain measures date to 1872.

Around 1843 the streets were lit by twelve street lights. A terrible epidemic of cholera struck the town in 1854 and resulted in many deaths. The majority were buried in the new chapel.

Inside the walls, people always possessed houses where animals also lived. La Bastide-de-Sérou has long lacked water inside its walls. After 1858 water was stored in the Tower of Loli to feed water fountains.

The savings bank was founded in 1862 then, in 1864, the telegraph office was built. Around 1870 there were four fairs a year, each lasting two days. The town hall was at the corner of Rue de Foix and Rue de la Rose. The Franciscan convent, which dates from 1222, housed a farm since 1882.

La Bastide-de-Sérou appears as La Bastide de Seron on the 1750 Cassini Map and as LA BASTIDE on the 1790 version.

Heraldry

Administration

List of Successive Mayors

Mayors from 1935

Education
The commune has a primary school.

Demography
In 2017 the commune had 957 inhabitants.

Culture and heritage

Civil heritage
The commune has a number of buildings and sites that are registered as historical monuments:
The Tour du Loup (13th century)
An Old Copper Mine (Gallo-Roman)
The Chateau of Castelmir Pleasure Garden

Religious heritage
The Church of Aron contains two items that are registered as historical objects:
A Chalice (18th century)
A Bust-Reliquary of Saint Valier (18th century)
The Church of Vic contains two items that are registered as historical objects:
A Chalice (18th century)
A Chalice (19th century)
The Parish Church of Saint John the Baptist contains several items that are registered as historical objects:
6 Candlesticks (18th century)
A Bronze Bell (14th century)
A Bas-relief: Virgin of Pity (18th century)
A Group Sculpture: Virgin of Pity (15th century)
2 Chandeliers (18th century)
A Tabernacle (18th century)
A Statue: Christ on the Cross (15th century)
A Processional Statue: Virgin and child (18th century)

The Church of Unjat is registered as an historical monument. The Church contains a Mural Painting (17th century) which is registered as an historical object.

See also
Communes of the Ariège department

References

External links
Official commune website 

Communes of Ariège (department)